Chang Won-ku (born 27 November 1935) is a Taiwanese judoka. He competed in the men's lightweight event at the 1964 Summer Olympics.

References

1935 births
Living people
Taiwanese male judoka
Olympic judoka of Taiwan
Judoka at the 1964 Summer Olympics
Place of birth missing (living people)